T. L. (Ted) Lozanski (August 25, 1926 – September 7, 1976) was a Canadian football player who played for the Winnipeg Blue Bombers. He was also an ice hockey player, coach and executive (former president of the  Manitoba Amateur Hockey Association). He is a recipient of the Manitoba Centennial Medal for his contributions to amateur hockey in Manitoba.

References

1926 births
1976 deaths
Canadian football quarterbacks
Winnipeg Blue Bombers players
Players of Canadian football from Manitoba
Canadian football people from Winnipeg